(singular Maultasche) are a kind of large meat-filled dumpling in Swabian cuisine. They are square or rectangular in shape.

On 22 October 2009, the European Union recognized  ( or ) as a 'Protected Geographical Indication (PGI)' and remarked that the dish is significant to the cultural heritage of Baden-Württemberg.  This measure provides protection to the integrity of the dish, mandating that genuine  are only produced in Swabia, a historical region that was incorporated into the modern German states of Baden-Württemberg and Bavaria.

History
In Swabia,  are the traditional dish associated with the Lenten commemoration of Maundy Thursday and Good Friday.  During Lent, Catholics and other Christians are encouraged to refrain from eating meat.  However,  are humorously associated with these days because the meat in the dish is concealed under the pasta dough and cannot be seen by God.  Among the anecdotal stories regarding the origin of the dish, one claims that  were created by the Cistercian monks of Maulbronn Abbey for that purpose. A Swabian German nickname for the dish, means "God-cheaters".

One of the earliest mentions of the name  is associated with several recipes in a 1794 cookbook—however, these are recipes for sweet desserts, and not a savory meat-filled entree.

Thus,  literally would mean "feedbag"—as in a bag used for feeding livestock—and probably derives this name from its appearance. The second meaning could be that from an archaic word — either  or —for a "slap in the face." If this were its origins, the name could be a comparison between a swollen cheek after being slapped with the shape and appearance of the dish.

Preparation
 are traditionally prepared in two ways, either:
  (simmered in broth and served like a soup),
  (dressed with butter and onions).

Some recipes for  use bacon for the meat filling.

Some German descendants in Southwest Wisconsin (USA) make a dessert of the same name, due to its visual similarities to the sliced dinner version. Its ingredients include flour, eggs, apples and cinnamon.

See also

German cuisine
List of German dishes
 List of stuffed dishes
 Ravioli
 Wonton
 Kreplach

References

Literature

German products with protected designation of origin
Pasta dishes
Dumplings
German words and phrases
Swabian cuisine
Stuffed dishes
Ground meat